Time Paradox is a point-and-click adventure game developed and released by Flair Software for the MS-DOS in 1996 only in Europe.

Plot
A futuristic agent named Kay is sent on a mission to stop the evil Morgana Le Fay. She first travels back in time to "the time of dinosaurs and cavemen" (sic), and then jumps to the medieval era in order to find and rescue the wizard Merlin from Morgana's castle and eventually defeat the sorceress.

Development
Time Paradox has been in development for several years, having been in first publicly shown in 1993. The game was originally supposed to be released as Genesis already in the first half of 1994 and to be a FMV based, featuring digitized graphics. Besides the PC version, the developers also planned to create the Amiga computer and CD32 versions.

Reception
The game was poorly received by gaming press upon its release, including receiving one star out of five in Germany's PC Player. It also got low review scores in Polish magazines Gambler (48%) and Secret Service (2/10). Retrospectively, Adventure-Archiv rated it a 57% in 2002.

See also
Chronicles of the Sword, another 1996 adventure game with a similar quest to defeat Morgana

References

External links

Time Paradox at GameFAQs

1996 video games
Cancelled Amiga games
DOS games
DOS-only games
Europe-exclusive video games
Fantasy video games set in the Middle Ages
Point-and-click adventure games
Prehistoric people in popular culture
Science fantasy video games
Single-player video games
Video games about time travel
Video games based on Arthurian legend
Video games developed in the United Kingdom
Video games featuring female protagonists
Video games set in the Middle Ages
Video games about witchcraft
Merlin
Flair Software games